New College is a historic building at the University of Edinburgh which houses the university's School of Divinity. It is one of the largest and most renowned centres for studies in Theology and Religious Studies in the United Kingdom. Students in M.A., M.Th. and Ph.D. degree programmes come from over 30 countries, and are taught by almost 40 full-time members of the academic staff. New College is situated on The Mound in the north of Edinburgh's Old Town.

New College originally opened its doors in 1846 as a college of the Free Church of Scotland, later of the United Free Church of Scotland, and since 1935 has been the home of the School of Divinity (formerly the Faculty of Divinity) of the University of Edinburgh. As "New College" it continues the historic commitment to offer a programme of academic preparation for ministry in the Church of Scotland, also made use of by ministerial candidates from other churches. In the 1970s the Faculty of Divinity also began offering undergraduate degrees in Theology and Religious Studies, and students in these programmes now make up the majority of the nearly 300 undergraduates enrolled in any given year.

History 
The founding of New College came as a result of a religious conflict that emerged out of the Disruption of 1843 in which clergy and laity left the established Church of Scotland to establish the Free Church of Scotland – free from state connections and submitting only to the authority of Christ. New College was established as an institution for the Free Church of Scotland to educate future ministers and the Scottish leadership, who would in turn guide the moral and religious lives of the Scottish people. New College opened its doors to 168 students in November 1843 and, under the guidance of its first principal Thomas Chalmers, oversaw the construction of the current building. A competition for design of the Free High Church and Free Church College was held in 1844 and, though not one of the winners, the design by William Henry Playfair was chosen and built 1845–1850. At the formation of the United Free Church, the United Free Church was granted the buildings, and the continuing Free Church operated from new premises in 1907. This Free Church College was renamed Edinburgh Theological Seminary in 2014.

Prior to the 1929 reunion of the Church of Scotland, candidates for the ministry in the United Free Church studied at New College, whilst candidates for the old Church of Scotland studied in the Divinity Faculty of the University of Edinburgh. During the 1930s the two institutions came together, sharing the New College site on The Mound. "New College" can designate the site itself, or the legal entity that continues to function in an official relationship with the Church of Scotland, the Principal of New College appointed by the General Assembly of the Church of Scotland and responsible particularly for Church of Scotland candidates for ministry. 

The current principal is the Reverend Professor Susan Hardman Moore. As the "School of Divinity," however, it is a unit in the University of Edinburgh with a much wider remit, and is led by the Head of the School of Divinity (currently Professor Helen Bond), who is appointed by the University, and who oversees the larger academic and financial operation. The Chair of Divinity at the School of Divinity is the oldest one at the University of Edinburgh, which can be dated back in 1620. Professor Rachel Muers will take up the Chair in August 2022 as the first woman who holds the post. Over the years, a number of notable figures have been among its academic staff, including Robert Rainy, Thomas Chalmers, Hugh Ross Mackintosh, James Barr, Thomas F. Torrance, James S. Stewart, John Baillie, John McIntyre, Ruth Page, Norman Porteous, Marcella Althaus-Reid, Andrew F. Walls, David Fergusson and others.

Academics 
Members of academic staff are all employees of the University of Edinburgh, and are today an international body of scholars of various persuasions in religious matters.

Academic Ratings 
New College is rated among the best schools of theology, philosophical theology, and religious studies in the UK, according to the most recent national Research Excellence Framework.

Undergraduate 
The School of Divinity offers six different undergraduate (Honours) degrees. The MA Theology allows students to focus on traditional areas of Christian studies (Biblical Studies, Ecclesiastical History, Christian Ethics, and Systematic Theology). The MA Religious Studies introduces students to the methods of the study of religion and a variety of religious traditions such as indigenous religions, Islam, Judaism, Christianity, Buddhist and Hindu traditions. The Bachelor of Divinity prepares candidates for the ministry (and is open to other interested students also). The MA Religious Studies and English/Scottish Literature, the MA Philosophy and Theology, and the MA Divinity and Classics allow students to work cross-disciplinary.

Postgraduate 
The School also offers several M.Th., M.Sc. and M.Res. degree programmes (Biblical Studies, Science and Religion, Theology in History, Theology and Ethics, World Christianity, Islam & Christian–Muslim Relations, and Religious Studies), and is an internationally known centre for PhD studies in a broad spectrum of specialities. There is no confessional test for staff or students. Only a portion of the undergraduate students are ministerial candidates, and the majority enter a variety of careers after studies (e.g. teachers, libraries, TV/radio production, civil service, further professional studies in law, finance, social work, etc).

Research Centres 
New College is home to several research centres: the Centre for the Study of World Christianity (established by Andrew F. Walls, which has its own collection of archival material on the history of Christian missions); the Centre for Theology and Public Issues; and the Centre for the Study of Christian Origins.

Facilities 
New College is located in the city centre on Mound Place, overlooking Princes Street Gardens, the Scottish National Gallery, and Princes Street. The neo-gothic building was designed by the respected 19th century architect William Henry Playfair.

Library 

The New College library was founded in 1843 as the Library of the Free Church College. It is the largest single-site theological library in the United Kingdom, holding a large collection of manuscripts, including the papers of Thomas Chalmers, John Baillie, J. H. Oldham and James S. Stewart.

The library is situated in the eastern wing of New College, and its splendid reading hall was originally built as the sanctuary of the Free High Kirk.

Rainy Hall 
Rainy Hall is a gothic revival dining hall, adorned with heraldry and featuring a hammerbeam roof. It is at the centre of college life, used by students and faculty for conversation and meals.

General Assembly Hall 
As well as the teaching facilities and the library, the New College complex also includes the General Assembly Hall of the Church of Scotland, which, however, remains the property of the Church, and is where annual meetings of the General Assembly of the Church of Scotland are held. This hall was used during the famous Edinburgh 1910 World Missionary Conference and was the temporary home for the debating chamber of the Scottish Parliament from its establishment in 1999 until the completion of the new Scottish Parliament Building at Holyrood in 2004.

People

Principals of New College

Notable faculty 

Notable Former Faculty (20th and 21st Century)

Afe Adogame
Marcella Althaus-Reid
Hans M. Barstad
F. F. Bruce
Gary Badcock
Jane Dawson
John C McDowell
J. C. L. Gibson
Larry Hurtado
Alistair Kee
Harry Kennedy
David Kerr
Elizabeth Koepping
Daniel Lamont
Christian Lange
James P. Mackey
Hugh Ross Mackintosh
William Manson
Bruce McCormack
A. R. McEwen
John McIntyre
Paul Nimmo
Michael Northcott
Noel O’Donoghue
Oliver O'Donovan
Douglas Templeton
Elizabeth Templeton
T. Jack Thompson
G. T. Thomson
Thomas F. Torrance
Kevin Vanhoozer
Géza Vermes
Andrew Walls
Roland Walls
Adam Cleghorn Welch
Frank Whaling
David F. Wright
Nicolas Wyatt
John Zizioulas

Notable Former Faculty (19th Century)

David Welsh
John Duncan
John Duns
Alexander Campbell Fraser
George Smeaton
James Bannerman
James Buchanan
Andrew B. Davidson
Alexander Duff
John Fleming
James Young Simpson
Thomas Smith
James MacGregor
William Garden Blaikie
Alexander Black

Arms

References

Further reading

External links 
 

1846 establishments in Scotland
Church of Scotland
Buildings and structures of the University of Edinburgh
Bible colleges, seminaries and theological colleges in Scotland
Category A listed buildings in Edinburgh
Royal Mile
Educational institutions established in 1846
Schools of the University of Edinburgh